Miss Universe Thailand 2013, the 14th Miss Universe Thailand pageant, was held at the Royal Paragon Hall, Siam Paragon in Bangkok on May 11, 2013. The contestants will camp in Krabi. before flying back to Bangkok for the final stage. Farida Waller, Miss Universe Thailand 2012, was crowned her successor Chalita Yaemwannang from Bangkok at the end of this event.

In the final round, broadcast live on Channel 5. Chalita Yaemwannang, was crowned Miss Universe Thailand 2013 by Nutpimon Nattayalak, Miss Universe Thailand 2012.

The winner is Chalita Yaemwannang represented for Thailand at the Miss Universe 2013 pageant. This year, 1st Runner-up Chonthica Tiengtham went to represent Thailand at Miss International 2013 instead of Miss Earth 2013 because Miss Universe Thailand Organization lost the license of the Miss Earth pageant.

Results

Placements
Color keys

Special awards

Judges
 Preeya Kullavanich
 Petcharaporn Watcharapol
 Patra Sila-on - President S&P Public Company Limited Thailand.
 Apasra Hongsakula - Miss Universe 1965
 Sudarat Burapachaisri
 Asst.Prof. Ua-En-Doo Disakul Na Ayuthaya
 Panya Vijinthanasarn
 Takonkiet Viravan
 Wilak Lothong
 Gun Kantathaworn - Actor

Delegates

Withdraw
 #21  Chonburi - Yoschaya Kongpraditngam

Replace
 #21  Chiang Mai - Wannapa Sripasom

Notes
 #4 Patcharida Phumiphet competed in Miss Teen Thailand 2011 but both did not place.
 #8 Nuttaporn Dumponngam competed in Miss Teen Thailand 2012 but both did not place.
 #15 Wantinee Fakkaew competed in Miss Teen Thailand 2012 where she was 2nd runner-up and won Miss Photogenic award.
 #22 Kancharee Pattana competed in Miss Thailand Universe 2010 but both did not place.
 #27 Chonthicha Tiangtham competed in Miss Teen Thailand 2011 but both did not place.
 #28 Nakanantinee Wongjit competed in Miss Thailand World 2012 but both did not place.
 #32 Khaneporn Intamoon competed in Miss Thailand Universe 2010 but both did not place.
 #26 Punika Kulsoontornrut competed in Miss Earth 2013 and Miss International  2014 and place 2nd Runner-up in both said pageant. Later, she came back Miss Universe Thailand 2020 and once again finished as 2nd Runner-up.

References

External links
 Miss Universe Thailand official website
 T-Pageant Club

2013
2013 beauty pageants
2013 in Bangkok
May 2013 events in Thailand
Beauty pageants in Thailand